Val is a municipality and village in Tábor District in the South Bohemian Region of the Czech Republic. It has about 300 inhabitants.

Administrative parts
The village of Hamr is an administrative part of Val.

References

Villages in Tábor District